Killer rabbit may refer to:

 Rabbit of Caerbannog, a fictional beast from the film Monty Python and the Holy Grail
 Jimmy Carter rabbit incident, a 1979 incident involving a swamp rabbit trying to board President Jimmy Carter's fishing boat
 The creatures from the 1972 horror film Night of the Lepus

See also 
 The Killer Rabbits, a 20th-century comedy rock band
 White Rabbit (comics), a fictional character who sometimes employs killer rabbits